Gheorghe Culcea (born 16 April 1939) is a Romanian fencer. He competed in the team sabre event at the 1972 Summer Olympics.

References

1939 births
Living people
Romanian male fencers
Romanian sabre fencers
Olympic fencers of Romania
Fencers at the 1972 Summer Olympics